Pileru is a census town in Annamayya district of Rayalaseema region of the Indian state of Andhra Pradesh. Pileru is located 188 kilometers North-West of Chennai, the capital city of Tamil Nadu and 196 kilometers North East of Bangalore, the capital city of Karnataka. It is the mandal headquarters of Pileru mandal in Rayachoti revenue division. The name Pileru means a Small river stream "Pilla Eru".

Geography 
It is located at an average elevation of 458 m (1,502 ft) above mean sea level.

Pileru is located at 

There are 14 villages in this mandal apart from Pileru:

	Agraharam	
	Avuvaripalle	
	Bodumalluvaripalle	
	Doddipalle	
	Gudarevupalle	
	Jandla
	Kavalipalle	
	Maddelacheruvu	
	Mellacheruvu	
	Mudupulavemula	
	Regullu
	Talupula	
	Vepulabylu	
	Yerraguntlapalle

Education
The primary and secondary school education is imparted by government, aided and private schools, under the School Education Department of the state. The medium of instruction followed by different schools are English, Telugu and Urdu.

Schools In Pileru:
 GOVT High School Kotapalli,Pileru
 AP Residential school
 Sree Bhuvana Educational Institutions(Sree Bhuvana Vidyalayam)
 SVSN Siddartha EM High School
 AVR EM High School
 Kakatiya EM High School
 Ratnam High School
 Sadhana High School
 Sri Vivekananda EM High School
 Sri Sai Baba High School
 Narayana EM High School
 Sri Chaitanya EM High School
 Boys High School
 Girls High School

Junior Colleges In Pileru:
 GOVT Junior College Pileru
 Sri Medha Junior College
 Priyadarshini Junior College
 Sri Chaitanya Junior College
 Margadarsi Junior College

Degree Colleges In Pileru:
 Sanjay Gandhi Government Degree College Pileru(SGGDC)
 Sri Chaitanya Degree College(Sree Medha's)
 CNR Arts And Sciences
 Sri Bharathi Degree College
 Bhaskar ITI College

Engineering Colleges In Pileru:
 M.J.R. College of Engineering & Technology Pileru(MJRCET)

Notable People

 Nallari Kiran Kumar Reddy (Former Chief Minister Of Andhra Pradesh)

Transport

Pileru is the junction of two National highways(NH-40 and NH-71), also Pileru is the equidistant of 4 Cities.

                                  
 Chittoor To The South(59Km) 
 Tirupati to the east(57Km) 
 Madanapalle to the west(58Km)
 Rayachoti to the north(56Km)

 Pileru is located at the center point where the Annamayya, Chittoor and Tirupati  districts share their borders.

Pileru is also well connected by Railways Under Guntakal Railway Division (Southern Central Railways). Pileru serves as a bus depot headquarter of the Pileru region and the Bus services are provided by state corporations APSRTC (Andhra Pradesh), and KSRTC(Karnataka).

See also 
List of census towns in Andhra Pradesh

References 

 Mandals- http://des.ap.gov.in/jsp/social/Chittoor,%20DHBS%20-%202013.pdf
 Highways- https://en.wikipedia.org/wiki/National_Highway_71_(India),  https://en.wikipedia.org/wiki/National_Highway_40_(India),

Census towns in Andhra Pradesh
Mandal headquarters in Annamayya district